Approach is the Finnish rock band Von Hertzen Brothers's second full-length album. The album was released on 17 May 2006 in Finland and went gold. The first single released from the album was "Let Thy Will Be Done" and the second was "Kiss a Wish".

"Approach" won the Finnish Grammy (Emma) for Best Rock Album of the year 2006.

Track listing

"Disciple Of The Sun" – 8:12
"Let Thy Will Be Done" – 4:47
"River" – 4:02
"Endlessly" – 8:20
"In Your Arms" – 5:37
"Open Water Stormy Weather" – 4:47
"Ocean Of Mercy" – 7:42
"Kiss A Wish" – 9:30
"After All" – 5:03

Personnel

Kie von Hertzen - Lead guitars, vocals, etc.
Mikko von Hertzen - Lead vocals, guitars, etc.
Jonne von Hertzen - Bass, vocals, etc.
Sami Kuoppamäki - Drums and Percussion

Guests (in order of appearance)

Juha Kuoppala - Various keyboards on all Tracks
Jukka Puurula - Viola and Violin on Track 03
Antto Melasniemi - Flute on Track 05
Juho Martikainen - Double Bass on Track 07
Laura Närhi - Vocals on Track 07
Sonny Heinilä - Ney Flute on Track 08
Maikki Liuski - Vocals on Tracks 08, 09
Tuomas Murtomaa - French horn on Track 09
Tommi Lindell - Analog Pörinä on Track 09
Aldur Smith-Diesel, Denis Vinokur and Matti Pyykkö - Photography
Janne "Toxic Angel" Pitkänen at InferiArt - Artwork and layout

Trivia
The former Kingston Wall drummer Sami Kuoppamäki played the drums on the album.
The album was produced by the brothers themselves

External links
 Samples from the album at the band's official site
 Von Hertzen Brothers on Myspace

2006 albums
Von Hertzen Brothers albums